The 2016 Red Bull Global RallyCross Championship was the sixth season of the Global RallyCross Championship. Scott Speed was the reigning Supercars champion and Oliver Eriksson was the reigning GRC Lites champion. The schedule consisted of twelve rounds at eight different venues. The season started at Wild Horse Pass Motorsports Park on May 21 and it concluded at the Port of Los Angeles on October 9.

Schedule
A twelve-round provisional calendar was revealed on January 26, 2016 with the sixth, seventh and eighth round to be announced, though it was certain the sixth and seventh round would take place on a military base. On March 3, 2016 GRC announced the eighth round would take place in Atlantic City and on June 1, 2016 GRC announced the sixth and seventh round would take place at the Marine Corps Air Station New River. It was the first time since the 2012 season that all events were held in the United States.

Entry list

Supercars

GRC Lites
Every driver competes in an Olsbergs MSE-built GRC Lites car.

Results and standings

Race results

Drivers' championships

Scoring system
Points were awarded based on finishing positions as shown in the chart below:

In addition, points were awarded in all rounds of heats and semifinals. First place earned five points, second place earned four points, and so on through fifth place and below, which earned one point.

Supercars

GRC Lites

Manufacturers' championship

Notes

References

External links
 

GRC Rallycross
Global RallyCross Championship